Papas rellenas (English: stuffed potatoes) are the most popular type of croquettes in Latin American regions such as Peru, Ecuador, Bolivia, Mexico, Chile, Colombia, and the Caribbean (more so the Dominican Republic, Cuba and Puerto Rico). The first printed Latin American recipes date to the late 19th century, during a time when French cuisine (among others, e.g. Italian) was influencing the region.

Peruvian preparation
The dish is a potato-based dough into which a filling made of chopped beef and onions, whole olives, hard-boiled eggs, cumin and other spices is stuffed. Once prepared, the obloid mass is deep-fried. Potato flour is often added to give greater consistency to the dough. In Peru, the dish is usually accompanied with a "salsa criolla", or an ají sauce.

Caribbean variants
They consist of mashed potatoes stuffed with seasoned ground meat, various spices then deep fried.  The dish varies in preparation and presentation from country to country.  Papas rellenas are a local favorite in heavily Cuban-populated American cities such as Miami and Tampa, in which the Cuban version consists of potato balls stuffed with seasoned picadillo.

This dish is also extensively consumed in Puerto Rico, where it is called "relleno de papa". In Puerto Rico the potatoes are boiled and then mashed with eggs, cornstarch, milk, and butter. Papas rellenas are stuffed with cheese, picadillo, or choice of meat. The papas rellenas are then coated with egg wash, and rolled into cornmeal or bread crumbs before frying. The potatoes can be replaced with sweet plantains (relleno de maduros) or breadfruit (relleno de panapén).

In popular culture
Papa rellena was featured on the Bolivian episode of Netflix TV series Street Food in season 2.

See also

 List of stuffed dishes
 List of deep fried foods
Quibe

References

Bolivian cuisine
Potato dishes
Caribbean cuisine
Chilean cuisine
Colombian cuisine
Cuban cuisine
Dominican Republic cuisine
Peruvian cuisine
Puerto Rican cuisine
Stuffed dishes